The 2007 Austrian Figure Skating Championships took place between 14 and 16 December 2006 in Vienna. Skaters competed in the disciplines of men's singles, ladies' singles, and ice dancing. The results were used to choose the Austrian teams to the 2007 World Championships and the 2007 European Championships.

Senior results

Men

Ladies

Ice dancing

External links
 results

Austrian Figure Skating Championships
2006 in figure skating
Austrian Figure Skating Championships, 2007
Figure skating